Chaffyn is a surname. Notable people with the surname:

Edward Chaffyn, Member of Parliament in 1542
Thomas Chaffyn (disambiguation), multiple people

See also
Chaffin